Dale Baxter (born September 22, 1961) is an English-born Canadian soccer player who played as a goalkeeper.

Career  
Baxter played in the North American Soccer League in 1980 with Toronto Blizzards indoor team. The following season he was traded to the Washington Diplomats, and made his debut on May 9, 1981 against Tampa Bay Rowdies. In 1981, he played in the American Soccer League with Detroit Express. In 1982, he played in the National Soccer League with Toronto Italia. He received a trial with Toronto Blizzard in 1983, but failed to secure a contract.

In 1983, he played in the Canadian Professional Soccer League with Mississauga Croatia. The CPSL failed to complete their season and as a result folded which allowed for Baxter to play in the National Soccer League with former team Toronto Italia for the remainder of the season. In 1985, he assisted in securing the NSL Championship for Toronto Italia. The following season he assisted Toronto in defending their NSL Championship.

International career 
Baxter played with the Canada men's national under-20 soccer team, and featured in the 1980 CONCACAF U-20 Tournament.

References 

1961 births
Living people
Footballers from Luton
Canadian soccer players
Canada men's youth international soccer players
English footballers
English emigrants to Canada
Toronto Blizzard (1971–1984) players
Washington Diplomats (NASL) players
Detroit Express (1981–1983) players
Toronto Italia players
Toronto Croatia players
North American Soccer League (1968–1984) indoor players
American Soccer League (1933–1983) players
Canadian National Soccer League players
Canadian Professional Soccer League (original) players
Association football goalkeepers